Prince Yangpyeong (Hangul: 양평군, Hanja: 陽平君; 1498 - 10 October 1506), personal name was Yi In (Hangul: 이인, Hanja: 李仁) or Yi Seong and his childhood name was Yi Gang-Su (Hangul: 이강수, Hanja: 李康壽) was a Korean Royal Prince and the only son of Yeonsangun of Joseon and Royal Consort Suk-ui of the Yangseong Yi clan.

References

1498 births
1506 deaths
15th-century Korean people
Korean princes
House of Yi
Royalty and nobility who died as children